Major-General Sir Stanley Brenton von Donop  (22 February 1860 – 17 October 1941) was a British Army officer who became Master-General of the Ordnance.

Early life and education
Donop was born in Bath, Somerset, the youngest of four sons of Vice-Admiral Edward von Donop, and his wife, Louisa Mary Diana Brenton. His eldest brother was P. G. von Donop and his grandfather was the German official and historian Baron Georg von Donop, an illegitimate grandson of Charlotte Sophie of Aldenburg. He was educated at Wimbledon College and at the Royal Somersetshire College at Bath before attending the Royal Military Academy Sandhurst.

Military career
Donop was commissioned into the Royal Garrison Artillery as a lieutenant on 18 January 1880, promoted to captain on 1 April 1888, and to major on 9 October 1897. He served in the Second Boer War and in November 1900 was appointed Commanding Officer of Lord Methuen's Composite Regiment of Australian Bushmen, with the local rank (in South Africa) of lieutenant-colonel. He led an important action at Kleinfontein the following year. For his service in the war, he was mentioned in despatches (dated 8 April 1902) and received a brevet promotion to lieutenant-colonel in the South Africa honours list published on 26 June 1902.

In 1908 Donop was appointed Chief Instructor at the School of Gunnery and in 1911 he was appointed Director of Artillery at the War Office.

Donop had a key role in the First World War, having been appointed Master-General of the Ordnance in 1913. He ordered the 6-inch howitzers which were the main instrument for the bombardments on the Western Front.

He was also Colonel Commandant of the Royal Artillery.

Personality
Donop is described by a modern writer as being competent and hardworking, but as having a cold manner and showing a "barely concealed contempt for politicians". During the First World War these characteristics made him disliked by civilian colleagues who did not share his technical expertise, especially Prime Minister Lloyd George.

References

 

|-

1941 deaths
1860 births
People from Bath, Somerset
British people of German descent
British Army generals of World War I
Royal Artillery officers
Knights Commander of the Order of the Bath
Knights Commander of the Order of St Michael and St George
People educated at Wimbledon College
British Army personnel of the Second Boer War
Military personnel from Somerset
British Army major generals